Feuer und Flamme (German for "Fire and Flame", with the additional figurative meaning of "great enthusiasm"), released in 1985, is the third album by German pop band Nena and the fourth studio album of its singer, Gabriele "Nena" Kerner. The album was a success, reaching  in Germany.

Prompted by the success of 99 Luftballons (1984), which included English-language versions of songs from the band's first two albums, Nena recreated Feuer und Flamme in English as It's All in the Game (1985), with lyrics by Canadian singer Lisa Dalbello. The experiment failed commercially and was not repeated with the band's next album. Gabriele Kerner recorded a new bilingual German-English version of "Anyplace, Anywhere, Anytime" with Kim Wilde in 2002. The duet became a big hit in many European countries, including Germany, Austria, Belgium, Denmark, Switzerland and the Netherlands.

The fifth and final single from the album was "Du kennst die Liebe nicht", however, for the single release, the song was completely re-recorded. The single version was restructured and features different vocals as well as a different instrumental that just sporadically borrows motifs from the album version. It was later included on the compilation Nena die Band (1991).

Feuer und Flamme track listing

This track list represents the CD version of Feuer und Flamme. The LP edition has tracks 4 and 9 swapped. Length of track 10 on LP is 5:14 due to the much shorter (partly edited out) instrumental intro. On some CD releases, length of track 3 is 5:09.

It's All in the Game track listing
All English lyrics are written by Lisa Dalbello, except for bonus tracks 11–13.

Of the bonus tracks on the 2008 reissue, "At the Movies" was first released in 1984 as a single coupled with its German original, "Kino", from Nena (1983); "Just a Dream" and "99 Red Balloons" are tracks from 99 Luftballons (1984), here remixed; and the remix of "It's All in the Game" reprises the title track of the present album.

References

External links
It's All in the Game at the Nena Fansite.

1985 albums
CBS Records albums
Albums produced by Reinhold Heil
German-language albums
Nena (band) albums